Gibil in Sumerian mythology is the god of fire, variously of the son of An and Ki, An and Shala or of Ishkur and Shala. He later developed into the Akkadian god Gerra.

In some versions of the Enûma Eliš Gibil is said to maintain the sharp point of weapons, have broad wisdom, and that his mind is "so vast that all the gods, all of them, cannot fathom it". Some versions state Gibil, as lord of the fire and the forge, also possesses wisdom of metallurgy.

References 

Michael Jordan, Encyclopedia of Gods, Kyle Cathie Limited, 2002

Fire gods
Mesopotamian gods
Smithing gods